The Bell System Practices (BSPs) is a compilation of technical publications which describes the best methods of engineering, constructing, installing, and maintaining the telephone plant of the Bell System under direction of AT&T and Bell Telephone Laboratories. Covering everything from accounting and human resources procedures through complete technical descriptions of every product serviced by the Bell System, it includes a level of detail specific to the best way to wrap a wire around a screw, for example.

With sections regularly updated, printed and distributed, the BSPs were the key to the standardized service quality throughout the Bell System. They enabled employees, who had never met previously, to easily work with one another in the event of a service outage, a disaster, or merely when relocating. Updates cover manufacturing changes phased into production during a product's lifetime of interest to the installer, including changed product features, internal component parts, available colors and installation procedures. Collectors also use these documents to help date and restore vintage telephones.

Document organization
Issuance of Bell System Practices within the Bell System started in the late 1920s, when they replaced a similar compendium, the AT&T Handbook Specifications. Initially, BSPs were identified by mixed alphanumeric sequence numbers designating a section and a specific document number within each section. The sections consisted of one letter and two digits, followed by a period character and a three-digit document number.  The version of each document was indicated by an issue number. For example, the section designation C34.175 Issue 1 identified a document entitled Station Dials—2 and 4 Types—Maintenance.

In the 1950s, the format of BSP designations was changed to a nine-digit numerical format, written in three groups of three digits. The first three digits referred to the division, which indicated a broad subject area, such as subscriber sets or the No. 1 ESS. The next three digits indicated a specific subject area, such as the specific type of equipment used within the major division subject. The final three digits indicate the serial number of the document. The content could be general descriptive information, information on wiring and connections, test procedures, or piece-part replacement and repair information.

The BSP documents were produced in primarily two formats, 8 1/2"x11" pages for use in office environments, and in a small, portable format (4" x 6 7/8") for use by installers on the job, carried in their service trucks.
Starting in the 1970s the most frequently used BSPs were bundled in convenient handbooks each covering general subject matters, such as the Station Service Manual.

The 9-digit format and numbering system was also used by Nortel and ITT Corporation due to their provenance from the Bell System's manufacturing unit, Western Electric.

Changes after divestiture
After the Bell System divestiture of 1984, AT&T maintained the basic organization and maintenance of the publication under the revised name AT&T Practices, but the publication was later divided among the new companies created by divestiture.
Specifically, the AT&T Practices covered most equipment topics that stayed with Bell Labs, which acquired the name AT&T. Bellcore Recommendation covered network maintenance and design topics transferred to Bellcore. Bell Service Practices (and variations) referred to the plant and technical reference maintained by the various Regional Bell Operating Companies. Lucent Technology Practices, and other publications contained product lines taken over by the respective manufacturers. Avaya and Alcatel-Lucent still publish practices using the 9-digit section numbering format.

BSP nine-digit numerical index

References

External links
Technical Documentation for Bell System products  BSP History

	

Telephony equipment
Bell System
Bell Labs
American encyclopedias
English-language encyclopedias